Salvatore Pace (Naples, 1679  – April 13, 1733) was an Italian painter of the late-Baroque.

Biography
He trained and worked in the studio of Francesco Solimena. He often restored works in Neapolitan churches.

References

17th-century Italian painters
Italian male painters
18th-century Italian painters
Italian Baroque painters
1679 births
1733 deaths
Painters from Naples
18th-century Italian male artists